The 1985–86 Xavier Musketeers men's basketball team represented Xavier University from Cincinnati, Ohio in the 1985–86 season. Led by head coach Pete Gillen, the Musketeers finished with a 25–5 record (10–2 MCC), and won MCC regular season and MCC tournament titles to receive an automatic bid to the NCAA tournament. In the NCAA tournament, the Musketeers lost to No. 5 seed Alabama in the opening round.

Roster

Schedule and results

|-
!colspan=9 style=| Regular season

|-
!colspan=9 style=| Midwestern Collegiate Conference tournament

|-
!colspan=9 style=| NCAA Tournament

References

Xavier
Xavier Musketeers men's basketball seasons
Xavier